Allium subvillosum, the Spring Garlic, is a European and North African species of wild onion native to southern Iberia, the Balearic Islands, Sicily, northern Africa (Libya, Tunisia, Algeria, Morocco, and the Canary Islands) and the Azores where it might be introduced.

Allium subvillosum is a bulb-forming perennial up to 30 cm tall. Leaves are long and narrow, with long white hairs clearly visible to the naked eye. Umbel is hemispherical, with 15-20 flowers on long pedicels. Flowers are white with yellow anthers.

formerly included
Allium subvillosum var. clusianum, now called Allium subhirsutum

References

subvillosum
Onions
Flora of the Azores
Flora of the Canary Islands
Plants described in 1830
Flora of Malta